Coghlan may refer to:

People
 Coghlan (surname)

Places
 Coghlan, Buenos Aires, a barrio in Argentina named for John Coghlan
 Coghlan, Eastern Cape, a village in South Africa

Other uses
USS Coghlan (DD-326), a destroyer commissioned in 1921 and decommissioned in 1930
USS Coghlan (DD-606), a destroyer commissioned in 1942 and decommissioned in 1947
Coghlan's, a producer of camping goods